Rachel Martin (born December 14, 1954) is an American performance artist, draftsman, painter, printmaker, musician and writer based in Austin, Texas.

Early life
Martin was born in Yuba City, California as Dee-Deborah Rachel Martin. She has also been known as Rachel Martin-Hinshaw.

Education
Martin majored in English and took art and dance courses at University of North Texas in Denton and Texas Tech University in Lubbock prior to obtaining her BFA in studio art at the University of Texas at Austin. 

During her student years in Austin, Martin worked with transmedia artists Bogdan Perzynski and Bill Lundberg and with performance artists Carolee Schneemann and Linda Montano. In 1994 she collaborated with Montano on a piece entitled Day without Art, performed at the University of Texas.

Hard Women
Martin formed the performance art group Hard Women in 1990, which performed frequently in Austin, Houston and San Antonio until 1994. Martin and Suze Kemper, an original member of Hard Women, came together again for a number of performances in 2003.
Martin's performances often involved performing on the accordion, on which she has been a virtuoso since childhood.

Professional career
Martin has taught Performance Art at the University of Texas at Austin. Since 2003 Martin has been Assistant Dean for Student Affairs in the University of Texas at Austin, College of Fine Arts.

In 2007 Martin was honored by the National Academic Advising Association, South Central Region 7 Awards for Outstanding Advising Administrator- Certificate of Merit

In 1993 & 1998 Martin was honoured by the James W. Vick, Texas Excellence Awards for Academic Advising for her exceptional work with students. The award nominees are selected by students, and a student selection committee to recognize academic advisers "who have had an effective, positive influence on the educational experience of university students"

Personal life
Martin's son, Jimmie D. Martin-Hinshaw, is also a performance artist based in Austin, Texas. Her eldest son, Nicholas is a social and environmental organizer and electric car consultant in the Bay Area, CA.

Her Boston Terrier, Buster (named after Buster Keaton) figures frequently in her drawings and paintings.

Further reading
Austin Chronicle, "Exhibitionism: Difficult Women and Transgressive Daughters," Heather Barfield, Austin Chronicle, October 24, 2003.
Austin Chronicle, “Articulations,” Austin Chronicle, October 1, 1999.
"Hard Women Will Paint for Ten Minutes," Houston Chronicle, September 16, 1994.
Jane Cain, "Interview with Performance Artist Rachel Martin-Hinshaw," The Roc: The Voice of Rock Out Censorship (Jewett, Ohio), Issue 17, August/September 1994
Jane Cain, "ROC's Interview with Performance Artist Rachel Martin Hinshaw – Part II," The Roc: The Voice of Rock Out Censorship (Jewett, Ohio), Issue 20
"Hard Women: Bodies of Work," Austin Chronicle, Austin, Texas, April 9, 1993.
Live Interview for Minimum Wage Art Series with John Aielli, Eklektikos Program, K-UT Radio, Austin, Texas, February 17, 1993.
"'Candy Factory' Puts Spin on T.V. Soaps," Austin American-Statesman, January 3, 1992.
"It Ain't Easy Being Hard," Austin Chronicle, October 25, 1991.
"'Factory' Makes Theater Fresh Again," The Daily Texan, July 12, 1991.
"The Austin Scene," P-Form, Chicago, Summer 1991.
"Rachel Martin-Hinshaw: A Study in Scarlet," Austin Anthology 1991, Austin, 1991.
"The Austin Scene," P-Form, Chicago, Winter 1991.

References

American performance artists
Living people
1954 births
Artists from Texas
American draughtsmen